Edmund John (27 November 1883 – 28 February 1917) was a British poet of the Uranian poetry school. His verses were modeled on the Symbolist poetry of Algernon Charles Swinburne and other earlier poets.  Much of his work was condemned by critics for being overly decadent and unfashionable. He fought in the First World War but was invalided out in 1916.  He died a year later in Taormina, Sicily.

Bibliography
 The Flute of Sardonyx: Poems  (1913)
 The Wind in the Temple: Poems  (1915)
 Symphonie Symbolique  (1919)

References

External links
 The Flute of Sardonyx: Poems  (1913) at www.oldstilepress

1883 births
1917 deaths
British gay writers
Artists' Rifles soldiers
British male poets
20th-century British poets
20th-century British male writers
British Army personnel of World War I
British LGBT poets